Washington High School was a public high school in East Chicago, Indiana, which opened in 1898 but closed in 1986. Washington High School merged with Roosevelt High School to become East Chicago Central High School, known in the area as "Central."

History

Athletics
The Washington High School Senators athletic teams competed in the Indiana Lake Shore conference from 1969 until the school closed in 1986. Prior to 1969, the school was a member of the Northern Indiana conference (1927-1962), the Northwestern conference (1963-1967) and the Tri-City conference (1968). The school was also a member of the Indiana High School Athletic Association (IHSAA), the organization which governs athletic activities in Indiana.

The school sponsored various interscholastic athletics teams.  The Senators won state championships in basketball (1960, 1971). The 1971 "Dream Team" was ranked No.1 in the state for the entire season, and went undefeated (29-0) and won the Indiana state high school basketball championship. The team featured Tim Stoddard (who played baseball and basketball at N.C. State and spent 15 year in Major League Baseball, Pete Trgovich (who played at UCLA), and Junior Bridgeman (who played at Louisville and in the NBA). The three would all go on to reach the Final Four.

Kenny Lofton an MLB All-Star center fielder for several teams in the 1990s and 2000s, also went to East Chicago Washington. He played in an NCAA Men's Basketball Final Four in 1987 with Arizona, and joins Stoddard (who played in the 1983 World Series with the Baltimore Orioles) as the only two athletes to play in a World Series and a Final Four when he led off the 1995 World Series for the Cleveland Indians.

Notable alumni
 Vince Boryla, professional basketball player, coach, and executive
 Junior Bridgeman, professional basketball player and businessman
 Emilio A. De La Garza, posthumous recipient of the Medal of Honor
 Leslie Edgley, novelist, playwright, radio dramatist and screenwriter
 Katherine Jackson, matriarch of the Jackson family
 Kenny Lofton, professional baseball player
 Nick Mantis, professional basketball player
 Art Murakowski, professional football player and legislator
 Vincent Mroz, United States Secret Service agent involved in the 1950 shootout at Blair House
 Ray Ragelis, professional basketball player and coach
 Quentin P. Smith, Tuskegee Airman
 Tim Stoddard, professional baseball player and coach
 Pete Trgovich, college basketball player and coach
 Warren W. Wiersbe, Christian clergyman and author

References 

High schools in Indiana
Defunct schools in Indiana
Public schools in Indiana
1898 establishments in Indiana
1986 disestablishments in Indiana
Educational institutions established in 1898
Educational institutions disestablished in 1986